Ceryx joltrandi is a moth of the subfamily Arctiinae. It was described by Abel Dufrane in 1936. It is found in the Democratic Republic of the Congo.

References

Ceryx (moth)
Moths described in 1936